Menegazzia sabahensis is a species of lichen found in Southeast Asia.

See also
List of Menegazzia species

References

sabahensis
Lichen species
Lichens described in 2007
Lichens of Asia
Taxa named by Harrie Sipman